Maxime Bôcher (August 28, 1867 – September 12, 1918) was an American mathematician who published about 100 papers on differential equations, series, and algebra. He also wrote elementary texts such as Trigonometry and Analytic Geometry. Bôcher's theorem, Bôcher's equation, and the Bôcher Memorial Prize are named after him.

Life 

Bôcher was born in Boston, Massachusetts. His parents were Caroline Little and Ferdinand Bôcher. Maxime's father was professor of modern languages at the Massachusetts Institute of Technology when Maxime was born, and became Professor of French at Harvard University in 1872.

Bôcher received an excellent education from his parents and from a number of public and private schools in Massachusetts. He graduated from the Cambridge Latin School in 1883. He received his first degree from Harvard in 1888. At Harvard, he studied a wide range of topics, including mathematics, Latin, chemistry, philosophy, zoology, geography, geology, meteorology, Roman art, and music.

Bôcher was awarded many prestigious prizes, which allowed him to travel to Europe to do research. The University of Göttingen was then the leading mathematics university, and he attended there lectures by Felix Klein, Arthur Moritz Schoenflies, Hermann Schwarz, Issai Schur and Woldemar Voigt. He was awarded a doctorate in 1891 for his dissertation Über die Reihenentwicklungen der Potentialtheorie (German for "On the Development of the Potential Function into Series"); he was encouraged to study this topic by Klein. He received a Göttingen university prize for this work.

In Göttingen he met Marie Niemann, and they were married in July 1891. They had three children, Helen, Esther, and Frederick. He returned with his wife to Harvard where he was appointed as an instructor. In 1894 he was promoted to assistant professor, due to his impressive record. He became a full professor of mathematics in 1904. He was president of the American Mathematical Society from 1908 to 1910.

Although he was only 46 years old, there were already signs that his weak health was failing. He died at his Cambridge home after suffering a prolonged illness.

Bôcher's theorem 

Bôcher's equation 

Bôcher's equation is a second-order ordinary differential equation of the form:

The Bôcher Memorial Prize 

The Bôcher Memorial Prize is awarded by the American Mathematical Society every five years for notable research in analysis that has appeared in a recognized North American journal.

Winners have included James W. Alexander II (1928), Eric Temple Bell (1924), George D. Birkhoff (1923), Paul J. Cohen (1964), Solomon Lefschetz (1924), Marston Morse  and Norbert Wiener (1933), and John von Neumann (1938).

Works 
 1894: Ueber die Reihenentwicklungen der Potentialtheorie via Internet Archive
 1900: "Randwertaufgaben bei Gewöhnlich Differentialgleichung", Encyclopädie der mathematischen Wissenschaften Band 2–1–1.
 1907: (with E.P.R.DuVal) Introduction to Higher Algebra via HathiTrust
 1909: Introduction to the study of Integral Equations via Internet Archive
 1917: Leçons sur les méthodes de Sturm dans la théorie des équations différentielles linéaires et leurs développements modernes via Internet Archive.

Bôcher was one of the editors of the Annals of Mathematics, of the Transactions of the American Mathematical Society.

References

External links 

 Maxime Bocher biographical memoirs of the national academy of sciences.

National Academy of Sciences Biographical Memoir

19th-century American mathematicians
20th-century American mathematicians
Mathematical analysts
Harvard University faculty
Harvard University alumni
University of Göttingen alumni
1867 births
1918 deaths
Presidents of the American Mathematical Society
Cambridge Rindge and Latin School alumni
People from Boston
Mathematicians from Massachusetts
Members of the United States National Academy of Sciences